Yaxham Light Railway is a  narrow gauge light railway (heritage railway) situated adjacent to Yaxham railway station on the Mid-Norfolk Railway. It is located in the village of Yaxham in the English county of Norfolk.  The railway is listed as exempt from the UK Railways (Interoperability) Regulations 2000.

History 

Mr D.C. Potter opened the site's first narrow gauge line in the former goods yard in 1967. This was constructed for his Hunslet  "Cackler", and the disused tracks of this line can still be seen from passing trains on the Mid-Norfolk Railway.

Present day 

It operates a collection of industrial railway equipment acquired over the years from quarries and other locations throughout the country. Passenger trains are usually hauled by a variety of vintage diesel locomotives.

Rolling stock 

Steam locomotives
 YLR No.1 – "Coffee Pot" –  vertical boilered locomotive built at Yaxham
 YLR No. 20 – "Kidbrooke" – W. G. Bagnall Ltd  built 1917 (named after its service at RAF Kidbrooke)
 Kerr Stuart Joffre class No. 3010 - Sold to at a quarry at Carriers de la Vallee Heureuse, in France in June 1930. Imported by Rich Morris and displayed at Gloddfa Ganol. Moved to the Yaxham Light Railway, now awaiting restoration at the Statfold Barn Railway

Diesel locomotives
 YLR No. 2 – "Rusty" – Lister "Rail-Truck" built 1948
 YLR No. 3 – "Pest" – Lister "Rail-Truck" built 1954
 YLR No. 4 – "Goofy" – 1936 Orenstein & Koppel with a Single Cylinder Crude Oil Engine
 YLR No. 6 – "Colonel" – Ruston & Hornsby built 1940
 YLR No. 7 – Ruston & Hornsby 16 hp class, built 1934
 YLR No. 10 – "Ousel" – Motor Rail Ltd ‘20/28hp’ plate frame type, built 1937
 YLR No. 13 – "Warboys" - Motor Rail Ltd ‘20/28hp’ plate frame type, built 1940
 YLR No. 14 – "Army 25" – Ruston & Hornsby class ‘20DL’, built 1943
 YLR No. 18 – "Planet" – F.C. Hibberd & Co Ltd type 39, built 1962
 YLR No. 19 – "Penlee" – Hudson Hunslet 25 hp, built 1942. Ex-Gloddfa Ganol
 YLR No. 44 - Moes built c.1955

Standard gauge goods wagons
 	
 GWR 126977 MOGO Cars Wagon, grounded body and former narrow gauge locomotive shed.

See also
Bressingham Steam and Gardens
Bure Valley Railway
Mid-Norfolk Railway
North Norfolk Railway
Wells and Walsingham Light Railway
Whitwell & Reepham railway station

References

External links
Archive version of Yaxham Light Railway website
Yaxham Light Railway on Facebook

Heritage railways in Norfolk
2 ft gauge railways in England